Aurora is a c.1625-1627 painting by the Italian artist Artemisia Gentileschi, depicting the Roman goddess of dawn. It is part of a private collection in Rome.

Subject Matter
In Roman mythology, the goddess Aurora rises every morning to signal the arrival of the Sun by coloring the sky, which was used in the period as a metaphor for creativity and beauty. Her contemporary Pierre Dumonstier created a drawing of Artemisia's hand holding a brush which refers to the "hands of Aurora", praising both her beauty as well as her skill as a colorist.

Provenance
The painting passed through the Arrighetti family before arriving on the art market in Florence in 1974. Bissell believes the patron was Niccolò Arrighetti, associate of Michelangelo Buonarroti, who had commissioned Gentileschi to paint Allegory of Inclination a decade earlier.

References

Sources

1620 paintings
Paintings by Artemisia Gentileschi
Paintings of Roman goddesses
Aurora (mythology)